Aşk ve Ceza (English: Love and Punishment) is a Turkish television drama series that aired in 2010 and 2011. Nurgül Yeşilçay, Murat Yıldırım and Feride Çetin starring, the series were shot in Van, Bodrum and Istanbul. Since 2011, this series has been broadcast in more than 43 countries. In 2011, in Bosnia and Herzegovina on FTV, Croatia on Nova TV and Romania on Kanal D. In Serbia, it was aired from January 8, 2013, in 1PRVA. In Georgia TV Maestro started broadcasting this series on April 15, 2013, and January 17, 2014, on Slovenian channel Planet TV. And, from August 28, 2017, it is again airing by Bosnian  FTV.

Plot

A 29-year-old woman called Yasemin (Nurgül Yeşilçay) works at an advertising agency. She has been with her fiancé Mehmet (Caner Kurtaran) for over three years. Just a week before their wedding. Her life turns upside down as she feels deeply betrayed and unappreciated. She drops everything, and goes to Bodrum. In Van, Çiçek (Feride Çetin) is marrying Kemal Baldar (Ali Yiğit), the eldest son of the powerful Baldar family. Kemal Baldar's American educated, modern brother Savaş goes to Bodrum for a vacation after his brother's wedding. Those two have their first encounter at a bar in Bodrum. Yasemin, betrayed and devastated by the turn of events with her fiancé, finds herself in the arms of Savaş after a night of heavy drinking. Burdened with guilt and regret after her one night stand, she leaves without even learning Savaş's name. Savaş also fails to learn who the girl that stole his heart that night is. After receiving a phone call informing him that his newly married brother and his father died in a car accident, Savaş returns to Istanbul as head of his family. In the meantime, Yasemin finds out she is pregnant with Savaş's baby, and then she gives birth to a child named Ömer. While Savaş keeps dealing with his family's unconventional problems, he doesn't stop looking for Yasemin, the Cinderella.

Main cast

References

External links
 

Turkish drama television series
2010 Turkish television series debuts
2011 Turkish television series endings
ATV (Turkey) original programming
Television shows set in Istanbul
Television series produced in Istanbul
Television series set in the 2010s